Westminster Presbyterian Church is a Presbyterian Church located in downtown Minneapolis, Minnesota.  Its current location is the third location in downtown in over 140 years.  The building is listed on the National Register of Historic Places.

History

Westminster began as a gathering of eight people of Scottish, Irish and Welsh heritage in 1857.  In 1860, the congregation built its first church, on Fourth Street between Nicollet and Hennepin Avenues in downtown Minneapolis.  Because of the rapid growth of the congregation, the church soon outgrew its first location.  In 1883, construction of a new, larger church began at Seventh Street and Nicollet Avenue.

Twelve years after the opening of the second church site, the building was heavily damaged by a fire.  This prompted yet another move when the church rebuilt to its current location at Twelfth Street and Nicollet Mall, opening its doors for services in 1897.

This, the present church was designed as a collaboration between two prominent Minneapolis architects, Warren Howard Hayes and Charles Sumner Sedgwick.

In 1998, to coincide with the building's centennial, the congregation undertook an extensive renovation of the sanctuary.  This 3.5 million dollar project restored many of the sanctuary's original design elements, updated the structure and improved lighting and sound.  The newly renovated sanctuary opened for services on Sunday, December 20, 1998.

Historical landmark

In recognition of its historic and social significance, Westminster was listed on the National Register of Historic Places in 1998.  In May 1999 Westminster received the 1999 Heritage Preservation Award from the Minneapolis Heritage Preservation Commission and the Minnesota Chapter of the American Institute of Architects.

Mission statement
In response to the grace of God through Jesus Christ, the mission of Westminster Presbyterian Church is:
to proclaim and celebrate the Good News of Jesus Christ;
to gather as an open community to worship God with dignity and joy, warmth and beauty;
to nourish personal faith through study, prayer and fellowship;
to work for love, peace and justice;
to be a welcoming and caring Christian community, witnessing to God's love day by day
to work locally and beyond with our denomination and the larger Christian Church;
and, to be a telling presence in the city

References

External links

Westminster Presbyterian Church Homepage

National Register of Historic Places in Minneapolis
Churches in Minneapolis
Churches on the National Register of Historic Places in Minnesota
Presbyterian churches in Minnesota
Romanesque Revival church buildings in Minnesota
Churches completed in 1897